Defne Taçyıldız (born 5 February 2003) is a Turkish swimmer. She competed in the women's 200 metre butterfly at the 2020 Summer Olympics.

References

External links
 

2003 births
Living people
Turkish female swimmers
Turkish female butterfly swimmers
Olympic swimmers of Turkey
Swimmers at the 2020 Summer Olympics
Sportspeople from Ankara
21st-century Turkish women
Swimmers at the 2022 Mediterranean Games
Mediterranean Games competitors for Turkey